[[Image:foxrealtime.png|thumb|260px|Fox Real Time logo on Fox News]]Fox News Live is an American news-talk television program, the hard-news daytime programming of the Fox News Channel. It also referred to the short headline segments of nearly every hour on Fox News.

About
The show featured news, guest analysis, and interviews. Like other American cable news stations, there is news mixed with feature-like stories, as well as commentary and short debates between people on opposite sides of issues, usually between associates of candidates and officials, think-tank members, and journalists.

The headline segments, shown during every non–hard news hour throughout the day, were usually two-to-three-minute recaps of the news of the day, unique to Fox News Channel with an added timestamp on the intro graphic.

Supplementing headline updates, FNC introduced a fast-paced version of these headline updates in 2006, called "Fox Real Time," which appeared during live news coverage, typically only being one-minute in length. After the first year of their introduction, their appearances greatly diminished, and eventually only appeared during hours of Weekend LiveSince the network originally started the continuous hours of Fox News Live in the morning, they have slowly shifted away from the setup, replacing the 3:00 p.m. and 1:00 p.m. hours of the programming with Studio B in 2002, and DaySide in 2003 respectively. In 2006, DaySide was then replaced with The Live Desk due to Mike Jerrick and Juliet Huddy (the then hosts of DaySide) leaving the network to host the syndicated morning talk program, The Morning Show. In 2007, the shift continued with the replacement of the first two hours with America's Newsroom. In November 2007, with the addition of Happening Now and America's Pulse to the weekday lineup all weekday airings of Fox News Live have been discontinued. However, the Fox News Live format continues with America's Election HQ and later after election, America's News HQ, which airs on all FNL slots at the weekend. On March 5, 2021, it was announced that America's News HQ was renamed "Fox News Live."

Anchors

 Show Anchors 
Eric Shawn, 2009—present
Arthel Neville, 2010—present
Gillian Turner, 2017—present
Griff Jenkins, 2020—present
Jacqui Heinrich, 2021—present
Mike Emanuel, 2021—present
Aisha Hasnie, 2022—present
Bill Melugin, 2023—present

 Headline Segment Anchors 

 Anita Vogel, 2001—present
 Ashley Strohmier, 2020–present
 Jackie Ibañez, 2014—present
 Jon Scott, 2018—present
 Jonathan Hunt, 2002—present
 Kevin Corke, 2014—present
 Marianne Rafferty, 2006–present

Former Show Anchors
 Dari Alexander, now at WNYW in New York City
 David Asman, now an anchor on Fox Business
 Patti Ann Browne, no longer at Fox News
 Kiran Chetry, left for CNN; no longer there
 Jamie Colby, now host of Strange Inheritance on Fox Business
 Rita Cosby, left for MSNBC; no longer there
 Laurie Dhue, left for WPIX in New York; no longer there
 Kristin Fisher, now at CNN.
 Courtney Friel, left for KTLA in Los Angeles
 Rick Folbaum, left for WFOR in Miami, now at WANF in Atlanta
 Lauren Green, now chief religion correspondent for Fox News
 Bill Hemmer, now co-host of America's Newsroom Catherine Herridge, was host of Weekend Live Saturdays. Now at CBS News.
 E.D. Hill, was host of America's Pulse. No longer at Fox News.
 Page Hopkins, was co-host of Fox & Friends Weekend. No longer at Fox News.
 Gregg Jarrett, now a Fox News legal analyst and commentator.
 Martha MacCallum, now host of The Story with Martha MacCallum Brigitte Quinn, now anchoring mornings at 1010 WINS radio in New York City. No longer at Fox News.
 Jon Scott, now host of Fox Report Weekend Bob Sellers, left for WTTG in Washington, D.C.; no longer there
 Jane Skinner, was co-host of Happening Now. No longer at Fox News.
 Shepard Smith, no longer at Fox News
 Linda Vester, no longer at Fox News
 Leland Vittert, now at NewsNation.

Former Headline Segment Anchors
 Dari Alexander, now at WNYW
 Julie Banderas, during weekends
 Patti Ann Browne, during Your World with Neil Cavuto and Glenn Beck, substitute anchor
 Janice Dean, substitute anchor, also a meteorologist
 Ainsley Earhardt, overnight
 Harris Faulkner, weeknights and during Special Report with Brit Hume''
 David Folk Thomas, no longer at Fox News
 Donna Fiducia, no longer at Fox News
Aisha Hasnie, Former weekend overnight Anchor, Now Congressional Correspondent
 Carol Iovanna, no longer at Fox News
 Gregg Jarrett, Saturday mornings, also a substitute anchor
 Uma Pemmaraju, also a substitute anchor
 Suzanne Sena, weekend overnight

Chronology

References

External links
 Fox News Live on FoxNews.com
 
 Fox News Live Online 

Fox News original programming
1996 American television series debuts
2008 American television series endings
1990s American television news shows
2000s American television news shows